The 1848 United States presidential election in Maine took place on November 7, 1848, as part of the 1848 United States presidential election. Voters chose nine representatives, or electors to the Electoral College, who voted for President and Vice President.

Maine voted for the Democratic candidate, Lewis Cass, over Whig candidate Zachary Taylor and Free Soil candidate Martin Van Buren. Cass won Maine by a margin of 5.62% over Taylor. This was the last time until 1968 that Maine would back a losing Democrat in a presidential election.

Results

See also
 United States presidential elections in Maine

References

Maine
1848
1848 Maine elections